Apo2.7 is a protein confined to the mitochondrial membrane. It can be detected during early stages of apoptosis.  It can be used to detect apoptosis via flow cytometry.

Apoptosis
Proteins